Amir Tag Elsir (born 1960), also written Amir Taj al-Sir, is a Sudanese medical doctor and novelist, writing in Arabic. He has published more than 20 works of poetry, biography and novels, some of these translated into English or other languages. His novels deal with contemporary social issues, like poverty, the lives of refugees or diseases, such as Ebola.

Life and literary career
Tag Elsir was born in northern Sudan in 1960 and graduated from Tanta University in Egypt. He lives and works as a medical doctor in Doha, Qatar.

His first novel Karmakul came out in 1988. In 2015, he won the Katara Prize for Arabic Novel for his story of love and crime, entitled 366. In addition, several of his other novels were shortlisted for the prestigious International Prize for Arabic Fiction.

Commenting on the novel Telepathy, literary critic M.A. Orthofer said, Tag Elsir creates the fiction of "a successful Sudanese writer, who finds that his most recent novel, called Hunger's Hopes, turns out to be closer to real life than he had any reason to believe." According to a review in Sudanese online magazine Andariya, his novels treat contemporary social issues "like the exploitation of the refugees and their harsh living conditions, and tackles the issue of poverty plaguing the citizens of the country."

Selected works in English translation
 French Perfume (2009)
The Grub Hunter (2010). Pearson Education. 
The Korak council (2012)
The Yelling Dowry (2013). Moment Digibooks Limited 
Telepathy (2015). Bloomsbury Qatar Foundation Publishing. 
 Ebola '76 (2015). London: Darf Publishers. 
366 (2016)

See also 
Sudanese literature
List of Sudanese writers
Modern Arabic literature

References

External links 
 Amir Tag Elsir on goodreads
 A chapter from Amir Tag Elsir’s  Ebola ‘76 in English translation

1960 births
Living people
Sudanese novelists
20th-century Sudanese writers
21st-century Sudanese writers
Sudanese male writers